Jack Rice (May 14, 1893 – December 14, 1968) was an American actor best known for appearing as the scrounging, freeloading brother-in-law in Edgar Kennedy's series of short domestic comedy films at the RKO studio, and also as "Ollie" (aka "Oliver Merton" and "Oliver Shaw") in around a dozen of Columbia Pictures's series of the Blondie comic strip.

Born in Michigan to Dr. John Rice (1858–1921) and Mrs. Eugenia Rice, née Kerwick,(1874–1897), Jack Rice began his career as a stage actor some time after the end of the First World War; he had previously worked as a travelling salesman in Grand Rapids. His stage credits included the annual road company tours of The Passing Show (1922–1925). He first appeared in films in 1933 and played roles in many shorts, feature films and TV. Rice appeared in the films Son of Flubber (1963), That Touch of Mink (1962), Ransom! (1956), The Spirit of 1976 (1935), The Pride of St. Louis (1952), Blondie's Big Deal (1949), Little Orphan Annie (1938), Walking on Air (1936), The 30 Foot Bride of Candy Rock (1959) and in the television programs, Bonanza, Checkmate and I Love Lucy.

Selected filmography

 No Marriage Ties (1933) – Newspaper Office Worker (uncredited)
 Morning Glory (1933) – Newspaperman (uncredited)
 Flying Down to Rio (1933) – Yankee Clipper (uncredited)
 His Greatest Gamble (1934) – Gambling Casino Patron (uncredited)
 The Girl from Missouri (1934) – Party Guest Dancing with Countess (uncredited)
 Lady by Choice (1934) – Nightclub Patron (uncredited)
 Kid Millions (1934) – Ship's Passenger (uncredited)
 Lightning Strikes Twice (1934) – Hotel Desk Clerk (uncredited)
 Break of Hearts (1935) – New Year's Eve Celebrant (uncredited)
 Woman Wanted (1935) – Man Walking With Cane in Hotel (uncredited)
 Hi, Gaucho! (1935) – Pasquale – Horse Thief (uncredited)
 Annie Oakley (1935) – Bit Man in Saloon (uncredited)
 Tough Guy (1936) – Percy (uncredited)
 Love on a Bet (1936) – Passenger Waiting for Washroom (uncredited)
 The Farmer in the Dell (1936) – Charlie (uncredited)
 Silly Billies (1936) – Cavalry Officer (uncredited)
 Murder on a Bridle Path (1936) – Violet's Hotel Manager (uncredited)
 The Last Outlaw (1936) – Card Player (uncredited)
 Rhythm on the Range (1936) – Train Station Smoocher (uncredited)
 Dummy Ache (1936, Short) – Florence's Brother
 The Bride Walks Out (1936) – New Year's Eve Emcee (uncredited)
 Swing Time (1936) – Wedding Guest (uncredited)
 Walking on Air (1936) – Sponsor (uncredited)
 Mummy's Boys (1936) – Second Officer (uncredited)
 The Plough and the Stars (1936) – Minor Role (uncredited)
 Shall We Dance (1937) – Hotel Desk Clerk (uncredited)
 Easy Living (1937) – Man in Ball's Outer Office (uncredited)
 Stage Door (1937) – Playwright (uncredited)
 She Married an Artist (1937) – Attendant (uncredited)
 Lady Behave! (1937) – Clerk (uncredited)
 Wise Girl (1937) – Actor in Department Store Window (uncredited)
 I Met My Love Again (1938) – Professor George B. Stockwell (uncredited)
 Arson Gang Busters (1938) – Bradbury
 Crime Ring (1938) – Goshen's Employee (uncredited)
 Carefree (1938) – Man with Walking Cane (uncredited)
 The Mad Miss Manton (1938) – Doctor (uncredited)
 Little Orphan Annie (1938) – Bugs MacIntosh
 Twelve Crowded Hours (1939) – Professor Busby (uncredited)
 The Flying Irishman (1939) – Airplane Owner Selling It to Corrigan (uncredited)
 The Rookie Cop (1939) – Jewelry Store Owner (uncredited)
 Five Little Peppers and How They Grew (1939) – Mr. Barker (uncredited)
 Those High Grey Walls (1939) – Bruised-Hand Convict (uncredited)
 Sabotage (1939) – Minor Role (uncredited)
 Mr. Smith Goes to Washington (1939) – Lang (uncredited)
 Blondie Brings Up Baby (1939) – Detective with Mason (uncredited)
 Money to Burn (1939) – Thorne
 The Shadow (1940, Serial) – Taylor (uncredited)
 Danger on Wheels (1940) – Parker
 Five Little Peppers at Home (1940) – Bainbridge (uncredited)
 Turnabout (1940) – Second Photographer (uncredited)
 Passport to Alcatraz (1940) – Detective (uncredited)
 We Who Are Young (1940) – Savoy-Carlton Hotel Clerk (uncredited)
 The Lady in Question (1940) – Gaston (uncredited)
 Foreign Correspondent (1940) – Donald (uncredited)
 He Stayed for Breakfast (1940) – Marianne's Chauffeur (uncredited)
 The Lone Wolf Keeps a Date (1940) – Salesman Helping Lanyard (uncredited)
 Ellery Queen, Master Detective (1940) – Rogers' Assistant (uncredited)
 Adventure in Washington (1940) – Announcer (uncredited)
 Men of the Timberland (1941) – MacGregor's Secretary
 Broadway Limited (1941) – Haughty Reporter (uncredited)
 You'll Never Get Rich (1941) – 5th Avenue Jewelry Salesman (uncredited)
 Niagara Falls (1941) – Hotel Clerk
 New York Town (1941) – Oliver (uncredited)
 Brooklyn Orchid (1942) – Hotel Desk Clerk (uncredited)
 Yokel Boy (1942) – Teller (uncredited)
 Take a Letter, Darling (1942) – Salesman (uncredited)
 A Desperate Chance for Ellery Queen (1942) – Railroad Ticket Clerk (uncredited)
 Moonlight Masquerade (1942) – Hotel Clerk (uncredited)
 Enemy Agents Meet Ellery Queen (1942) – Railway Ticket Agent (uncredited)
 The Secret Code (1942, Serial) – Fred, Jensen's Clerk [Chs.2,4]
 Lucky Legs (1942) – Jewelry Salesman (uncredited)
 Reveille with Beverly (1943) – Davis (uncredited)
 Two Weeks to Live (1943) – Hotel Clerk (uncredited)
 She Has What It Takes (1943) – Kimball
 Good Morning, Judge (1943) – Hotel Clerk (uncredited)
 Gildersleeve's Bad Day (1943) – Hotel Clerk Charlie (uncredited)
 Good Luck, Mr. Yates (1943) – Steve (uncredited)
 Gals, Incorporated (1943) – Partridge (uncredited)
 Petticoat Larceny (1943) – Radio Actor (uncredited)
 Honeymoon Lodge (1943) – Surprised Man in Train Station (uncredited)
 Passport to Suez (1943) – Hotel Night Clerk (uncredited)
 So This Is Washington (1943) – Golf Hotel Desk Clerk (uncredited)
 The Adventures of a Rookie (1943) – Jim – Father of Party Guest (uncredited)
 So's Your Uncle (1943) – Designer
 Dangerous Blondes (1943) – Scott (uncredited)
 Crazy House (1943) – Dentist (uncredited)
 A Scream in the Dark (1943) – Desk Clerk at the Harvard Arms (uncredited)
 Campus Rhythm (1943) – Company Rep with Flowers (uncredited)
 Swingtime Johnny (1943) – Bill
 What a Woman! (1943) – Tailor (uncredited)
 Week-End Pass (1944) – Jenkins
 Casanova in Burlesque (1944) – Emory, the Dress Designer (uncredited)
 Hat Check Honey (1944) – C.B.
 Cover Girl (1944) – Reporter (uncredited)
 Hey, Rookie (1944) – Highbrow (uncredited)
 Lady, Let's Dance (1944) – Given
 Louisiana Hayride (1944) – Hotel Clerk (uncredited)
 Ever Since Venus (1944) – Butler (uncredited)
 The Merry Monahans (1944) – Ham Actor (uncredited)
 San Diego, I Love You (1944) – Hotel Clerk (uncredited)
 Goin' to Town (1944) – Clark
 The Mark of the Whistler (1944) – Mailman (uncredited)
 Bowery to Broadway (1944) – Quartette Member (uncredited)
 Hi, Beautiful (1944) – Board Member (uncredited)
 Carolina Blues (1944) – Jerry (uncredited)
 Practically Yours (1944) – Courturier (uncredited)
 Under Western Skies (1945) – Neil Mathews
 Her Lucky Night (1945) – Percy
 Leave It to Blondie (1945) – Ollie Shaw (uncredited)
 Eve Knew Her Apples (1945) – Hotel Clerk (uncredited)
 Boston Blackie Booked on Suspicion (1945) – Mr. Obie (uncredited)
 The Naughty Nineties (1945) – Waiter (uncredited)
 Radio Stars on Parade (1945) – Theater Usher (uncredited)
 Sunset in El Dorado (1945) – Mr. Hollingsworth (uncredited)
 Life with Blondie (1945) – Ollie Shaw (uncredited)
 The Stork Club (1945) – Stork Club Captain #2 (uncredited)
 Because of Him (1946) – Florist (uncredited)
 Meet Me on Broadway (1946) – Grannis (uncredited)
 Blondie's Lucky Day (1946) – Ollie Shaw (uncredited)
 The Runaround (1946) – Information Clerk (uncredited)
 Blondie Knows Best (1946) – Ollie Shaw (uncredited)
 The Best Years of Our Lives (1946) – Apartment Desk Clerk (uncredited)
 Vacation in Reno (1946) – Mr. Shark (uncredited)
 Blondie's Big Moment (1947) – Oliver "Ollie" Merton
 The Pilgrim Lady (1947) – Hotel Clerk
 Blondie's Holiday (1947) – Ollie Shaw
 A Likely Story (1947) – Secretary to the Senator (uncredited)
 Living in a Big Way (1947) – Court Stenographer (uncredited)
 Dark Delusion (1947) – Floorwalker (uncredited)
 They Won't Believe Me (1947) – Tour Conductor (uncredited)
 The Hucksters (1947) – Clerk – Selling Ties (uncredited)
 Cass Timberlane (1947) – Vincent Osprey – Arthur Olliford's Attorney (uncredited)
 Her Husband's Affairs (1947) – Slocum (uncredited)
 It Had to Be You (1947) – Floorwalker (uncredited)
 Blondie's Anniversary (1947) – Ollie Shaw
 The Bride Goes Wild (1948) – Reporter (uncredited)
 The Return of the Whistler (1948) – George Sawyer (uncredited)
 My Dog Rusty (1948) – Jack, the Photographer (uncredited)
 Blondie's Reward (1948) – Ollie Merton
 Blondie's Secret (1948) – Ollie Merton
 Blondie's Big Deal (1949) – Ollie Merton
 Take Me Out to the Ball Game (1949) – Room Clerk (uncredited)
 The Barkleys of Broadway (1949) – Ticket Man (uncredited)
 Take One False Step (1949) – Good Humor Man (uncredited)
 The Sickle or the Cross (1949) – Radio Engineer
 The Good Humor Man (1950) – Roger, Bridegroom (uncredited)
 Beware of Blondie (1950) – Ollie Shaw
 Shakedown (1950) – Floorwalker (uncredited)
 Counterspy Meets Scotland Yard (1950) – Power Company Clerk
 Corky of Gasoline Alley (1951) – Ames (uncredited)
 Aaron Slick from Punkin Crick (1952) – Hotel Clerk (uncredited)
 The Pride of St. Louis (1952) – Voorhees (uncredited)
 The Brigand (1952) – Tailor (uncredited)
 Stars and Stripes Forever (1952) – Mr. Jones (scenes deleted)
 The Silver Whip (1953) – Clyde Morrison, Silver City Telegrapher (uncredited)
 The Marksman (1953) – Clerk
 Ransom! (1956) – George's Assistant (uncredited)
 Crashing Las Vegas (1956) – Wiley
 Too Much, Too Soon (1958) – Druggist (uncredited)
 The 30 Foot Bride of Candy Rock (1959) – Booster (uncredited)
 That Touch of Mink (1962) – Customer at Automat (uncredited)
 Son of Flubber (1963) – 2nd Juror (uncredited) (final film role)

External links

1893 births
1968 deaths
Male actors from Michigan
American male film actors
American male television actors
Deaths from cancer in California
20th-century American male actors